Vojta can be either a shorter version of a first name Vojtech or a surname.  Notable people with the name include:

 Josef Vojta (1935–2023), Czech football player
 Paul Vojta (born 1957), American mathematician
 Václav Vojta (1917–2000), Czech doctor